Chov Sotheara (born October 10, 1983) is a Cambodian freestyle wrestler. She competed in the women's freestyle 48 kg event at the 2016 Summer Olympics, in which she was eliminated in the round of 16 by Carolina Castillo.

References

External links
 

1983 births
Living people
Sportspeople from Phnom Penh
Cambodian female sport wrestlers
Olympic wrestlers of Cambodia
Wrestlers at the 2016 Summer Olympics
Wrestlers at the 2006 Asian Games
Wrestlers at the 2010 Asian Games
Wrestlers at the 2014 Asian Games
Southeast Asian Games gold medalists for Cambodia
Southeast Asian Games medalists in wrestling
Southeast Asian Games bronze medalists for Cambodia
Competitors at the 2005 Southeast Asian Games
Asian Games competitors for Cambodia
20th-century Cambodian women
21st-century Cambodian women